Wug or WUG may refer to:

 Wake Up, Girls!, a Japanese mixed-media project, consists of idol group/seiyuu unit and anime series
 Wireless user group, a wireless network run by enthusiasts
 , the original title of Max Weber's magnum opus Economy and Society
 Universiade (translated as World University Games), an international athletic event for university students
 An imaginary creature depicted in the psycholinguistic investigative tool known as the Wug Test
 , the State Mining Authority in Poland